Maymarabad is a neighbourhood in the Malir district of Karachi, Pakistan, that previously was a part of Gadap Town until 2011.

See also 
 Ahsanabad
 Darsano Chana
 Gabol Town
 Gadap
 Gujro
 Gulshan-e-Maymar
 Gulshan-e-Sheraz
 Khuda Ki Basti
 Manghopir Hills
 Manghopir
 Gadap Town
 Murad Memon Goth
 Songal
 Surjani Town
 Yousuf Goth
 Sohrab Goth

References

Neighbourhoods of Karachi
Gadap Town